The Supreme Court of Canada was founded in 1875 and has served as the final court of appeal in Canada since 1949. Its history may be divided into three general eras. From its inception in 1875 until 1949, the Court served as an intermediate appellate court subject to appeal to the Judicial Committee of the Privy Council in Britain. Following 1949, the Court gained importance and legitimacy as the court of last resort in Canada, establishing a greater role for the Canadian judiciary. In 1982, the introduction of the Canadian Charter of Rights and Freedoms significantly changed the role of the Court in Canadian society, by providing the Court with greater powers of oversight over Parliament and through formal recognition of civil rights including aboriginal rights and equality rights.

Origins

Confederation
During the Confederation conferences leading to the formation of the Dominion of Canada prior to 1867, it was contemplated that a national court of appeal would be created to sit at the top of the Canadian legal hierarchy, especially to deal with disputes between the provinces and Parliament. However, the subject of the court did not generate much interest during the Confederation Debates.

There were some concerns over the establishment of general court of appeal. The largely Anglophone population of Canada West (which became the Province of Ontario) wanted continued oversight by the British Privy Council; while the largely Francophone population of Canada East (which became the Province of Quebec) were concerned about the accessibility of appeals involving travel to London, as well as the effect that a supreme court would have on Quebec civil law and Quebec nationalism more generally.

The ambivalent attitude toward the court during the Confederation Debates was displayed by John A. Macdonald (then the attorney general of Canada West and who would become the first Prime Minister of Canada), who was a proponent of strong federal institutions including the Supreme Court, when he said:

The Constitution does not provide that such a court shall be established. There are many arguments for and against the establishment of such a court. But it was thought wise and expedient to put into the Constitution a power to the General Legislature, that, if after full consideration they think it advisable to establish a General Court of Appeal from all the Superior Courts of all the provinces, they may do so.

When the British North America Act, 1867 was finalized, it provided Parliament with the permissive power ("may") rather than the imperative ("shall") to create a general court of appeal:

101. The Parliament of Canada may, notwithstanding anything in this Act, from Time to Time provide for the Constitution, Maintenance, and Organization of a General Court of Appeal for Canada, and for the Establishment of any additional Courts for the better Administration of the Laws of Canada.

After Confederation in 1867, there was a growing movement to create a final court of appeal for the new country. Nonetheless, it took eight years before the Supreme Court would finally be established due to unresolved tensions between various political factions. Macdonald, along with Télésphore Fournier, Alexander Mackenzie, and Edward Blake, championed the creation of a Supreme Court. In 1868, Macdonald delegated the task of drafting a bill to establish a supreme court to Henry Strong, and in 1869 a first draft of the legislation was submitted to Parliament. It appears that Macdonald had intended that this bill "was rather more for the purpose of suggestion and consideration than for a final measure which [the] Government hoped to become law."

Nonetheless, those strongly loyal to the English tradition opposed it and managed to get both the 1869 bill and a revised bill of 1870 withdrawn from Parliament. Additionally, there was resistance from Quebec until the Guibord case demonstrated to them that Privy Council rulings could not always be sensitive to their religious culture. Macdonald's government, however, became preoccupied with other matters and fell in 1873 without further success in establishing a supreme court.

Establishment of the Court by the Mackenzie Government
During the federal election of 1874, the Liberals led by Alexander Mackenzie listed the creation of a central court of appeal as part of their campaign platform. When the Mackenzie government ultimately took power, the issue was again mentioned in the throne speech of 1874. A new Supreme Court Bill was introduced to Parliament by Minister of Justice Télésphore Fournier in February 1875. On April 8, 1875, The Supreme and Exchequer Court Act passed with bipartisan support, which simultaneously established both the Supreme Court and the Exchequer Court.

Initial composition of the Court
At the outset, the Supreme Court was to be staffed by six justices. In addition, each of the six justices also sat individually as judges of the newly created Exchequer Court. This arrangement did not change until 1887 when the judges of the two courts were separated by legislative amendment. The selection of the initial members of the Court reflected a desire to establish legitimacy to the public and achieve regional representation across Canada. The Supreme Court Act, 1875 also allocated two of the six positions to Quebec in recognition of the unique civil law system employed by the province. Of the seats not reserved for Quebec, Mackenzie would appoint two justices from Ontario, and two from outside central Canada.

To recognize the growing importance of Ontario in the Confederation and to compensate for its acceptance of the same number of seats as Quebec in the newly formed Court, there was pressure to appoint an Ontarian as the Chief Justice. The position was first offered to Edward Blake, a renowned Ontario lawyer and Liberal politician. However, he declined the offer and instead accepted a post in government as the Minister of Justice. William Buell Richards, the chief justice of Ontario and formerly the attorney-general of Canada West, was ultimately appointed as Chief Justice. Samuel Henry Strong, who helped draft the 1869 proposal and was a judge on the Ontario Supreme Court, filled the other seat for Ontario. The Quebec positions were filled by Télésphore Fournier, the Minister of Justice who introduced the Supreme and Exchequer Court Act, 1875, and Jean-Thomas Taschereau, a judge of the Quebec Court of Queen's Bench. The remaining two seats went to William Johnston Ritchie, chief justice of New Brunswick, and William Alexander Henry, a former Nova Scotia MLA who lost his seat for his role as a Father of Confederation. The average age of the first six members of the Court was fifty-seven years, which would in fact be one of the youngest benches in the history of the Court.

Public reaction to the appointments were mixed, especially in Montréal, where the press raised concerns about the structure of the Court and the lack of commercial experience of the civil law jurists (both of whom were from the Quebec City area, leaving Montréal, then the largest city in Canada, unrepresented).

The six member structure of the Court inevitably resulted in several even split decisions, and it was eventually increased to seven in 1927. In 1949, with the abolition of appeals to the Judicial Committee of the Privy Council, the complement of judges was increased again to nine.

First cases of the Court
The court was inaugurated on November 18, 1875. However, there was a paucity of appeals to the Court in its first year. Thus, on the first sitting of the Court on Monday, January 17, 1876, the Court adjourned immediately as there was no case before the bench.

That April the Court was given a reference question from the Canadian Senate (in Re "The Brothers of the Christian Schools in Canada"). The Senate asked the Court if a bill entitled "An Act to incorporate the Brothers of the Christian Schools in Canada" was within the authority of the federal government to enact. Only four Justices were in attendance. Justices Ritchie, Strong, and Fournier held, without providing reasons, that the bill was within exclusive provincial authority. Chief Justice Richards abstained, expressing doubts as to whether the Court had jurisdiction to hear references of private members' bills. It was not until June 1876 that the Court heard its first case with Kelly v. Sulivan (which was given the court file number one).

Location of the Court

For its first five years of existence, the Court moved around among various vacant rooms in the Parliament buildings, including most notably the Railway Committee Room. Permanent accommodations were not provided until 1882, when they moved into a refurbished building on the southwest corner of the West Block of Parliament Hill (facing Bank Street). The building was originally designed by Thomas Seaton Scott, Chief Dominion Architect, and was constructed in 1873 as workshops and stables for the government. It was renovated with a design by Thomas Fuller in 1881 for the Supreme Court, which shared the building for six years with the National Art Gallery. However, complaints were lodged against the building by its occupants, listing problems such as a pervasive "dreadful smell", poor ventilation, small space, lack of offices, and distance to the parliamentary library.

In 1890, a new wing extending North of the building was constructed providing a basement, two additional storeys, and an attic, which nearly doubled the size of the courthouse facilities. The Court occupied this building until 1949, when they moved into a purpose-built building on Wellington Street, west of Parliament.

Under the Privy Council (1875–1949)
In the early days all cases could be appealed from the Supreme Court of Canada to the Judicial Committee of the Privy Council in London. As well, cases could bypass the Supreme Court and go directly to London from the provincial courts of appeal. The decisions of the Supreme Court on the interpretation of the Constitution tended to support the popular view that it was intended to create a powerful central government. The Privy Council, however, held a distinctly opposite view of the Constitution as providing for strong provincial powers . The decisions of Lords Haldane and Watson strongly reflected this view in their decisions which became increasingly unpopular. In many of their decisions they interpreted the Trade and Commerce power as well as the peace, order and good government power of the federal government to be exceptionally limited. Many of these decisions had the result of striking down a number of reforms proposed by both the Conservative Government of R. B. Bennett and the following Liberal government of MacKenzie King, despite public support. Consequently, provincial governments began to demand the federal government press the United Kingdom for judicial independence.  The Supreme Court of Canada formally became the court of last resort for criminal appeals in 1933 and for all other appeals in 1949. The last Canadian case heard by the Privy Council was in 1959, as the case had been grandfathered.

Independence as court of last resort (1949–1982)

Laskin Court
The appointment of Bora Laskin as Chief Justice in 1973 represented a major turning point for the Supreme Court. Many of the Laskin Court justices were either academics or well-respected practitioners, most had several years experience in appellate courts. Laskin's federalist and liberal views were an influence in many of the court's decisions. The change in direction of the court proved somewhat controversial. Laskin's style was abrasive enough that it provoked Justice Louis-Philippe de Grandpré to take early retirement. His promotion to Chief Justice also upset Ronald Martland, who by convention expected to be appointed to the position since he was the most senior puisne justice at the time.

Among the most notable cases to go through the court in this period included Calder v British Columbia (AG) [1973] SCR 313 where the court acknowledged the existence of a free-standing aboriginal right to land. In R v Sault Ste-Marie (City of) [1978] 2 SCR 1299, the court established the standard for strict liability offences in the criminal law. Reference re a Resolution to amend the Constitution [1981] 1 SCR 753 ("Patriation Reference") was one of the first times the court acknowledged the existence of an unwritten constitutional convention, namely the constitutional obligation to get consent from the provinces for an amendment.

Charter era (1982-present)

Dickson Court
The beginning of the Dickson Court corresponds to the first of the Charter cases heard by the Supreme Court.

The Dickson Court oversaw some of the most fundamental changes in Canadian jurisprudence. The court decided many foundational cases for Charter jurisprudence, including R v Oakes (section 1) and Retail, Wholesale and Department Store Union, Local 580 v Dolphin Delivery Ltd (scope of the Charter). Among the most radical decisions of this period include Re BC Motor Vehicle Act, which broke away from the conventional wisdom that due process only protected procedural rights by including substantive rights as well. This case was later followed up with the decision of R v Morgentaler, which proved significant both because it struck down the criminalization of abortion but also because of its expansion of due process rights into the civil context.

The Dickson Court era also saw the beginning of a major shift in Canadian administrative law, with the "pragmatic and functional approach" appearing in Union des Employes de Service, Local 298 v Bibeault.

The last years of the Dickson Court saw an entire revision of the area of conflict of laws by Justice Gérard La Forest in the decisions of Morguard Investments Ltd v De Savoye [1990] 3 SCR 1077. This would continue in the Lamer Court era with subsequent decisions such as Hunt v T&N plc, [1993] 4 SCR 289 and Tolofson v Jensen, [1994] 3 SCR 1022.

Lamer Court
Antonio Lamer's criminal law background proved an influence on the number of criminal cases heard by the court during his time as Chief Justice.

McLachlin Court
The appointment of Beverly McLachlin as Chief Justice has resulted in a more centrist and unified court. Dissenting and concurring reasons are fewer than during the Dickson and Lamer Courts. The court has also seen some of the lowest numbers of decisions released in a year. In 2006, only 59 judgments were released, the smallest number in 25 years.

See also 

History of Canada

References

Further reading

External links
 origins of the SCC
 history of the Duff Court
 Charter trends of the Supreme Court of Canada
 statistics from 1998 to 2008

Supreme Court of Canada